Ernest Lee "Junior" Spivey Jr. (born January 28, 1975) is a  former second baseman in Major League Baseball. In his five-year major league career, Spivey batted .270 with 48 home runs and 201 runs batted in in 457 games. He batted and threw right-handed.

Career
Spivey attended Cowley County College in Arkansas City, Kansas. He was a member of the Arizona Diamondbacks team when they won the World Series in 2001, 4 games to 3, against the New York Yankees.

Spivey was traded to the Milwaukee Brewers with Craig Counsell, Lyle Overbay, Chad Moeller, Chris Capuano and Jorge de la Rosa for Richie Sexson, Shane Nance and Noochie Varner. He signed with the St. Louis Cardinals on December 23, and spent the entire  season with the Triple-A Memphis Redbirds. He filed for free agency from the Cardinals after the season.

Spivey re-signed with the Red Sox in January , but was released during spring training.

Spivey was signed to a minor league contract by the New York Mets on March 16, 2009. However, he was released on March 31. During the  season, Spivey played for the Camden Riversharks of the Atlantic League and the Tucson Toros of the Golden Baseball League.

In 2010, Junior Spivey retired from baseball.

References

External links

Profile at The Baseball Cube

1975 births
Living people
Arizona Diamondbacks players
Milwaukee Brewers players
Washington Nationals players
African-American baseball players
Baseball players from Oklahoma
Cowley Tigers baseball players
Major League Baseball second basemen
National League All-Stars
Sportspeople from Oklahoma City
Arizona League Diamondbacks players
Lethbridge Black Diamonds players
High Desert Mavericks players
Tulsa Drillers players
El Paso Diablos players
Tucson Sidewinders players
Memphis Redbirds players
Pawtucket Red Sox players
Bridgeport Bluefish players
Camden Riversharks players
Tucson Toros players
21st-century African-American sportspeople
20th-century African-American sportspeople